The 1945 Connecticut Huskies football team represented the University of Connecticut in the 1945 college football season.  The Huskies were led by 11th-year head coach J. Orlean Christian and completed the season with a record of 7–1.

Schedule

References

Connecticut
UConn Huskies football seasons
Connecticut Huskies football